Biological Psychiatry is a biweekly, peer-reviewed, scientific journal of psychiatric neuroscience and therapeutics, published by Elsevier since 1985 on behalf of the Society of Biological Psychiatry, of which it is the official journal. The journal covers a broad range of topics related to the pathophysiology and treatment of major neuropsychiatric disorders. A yearly supplement is published which contains the abstracts from the annual meeting of the Society of Biological Psychiatry.

History 
The journal was established in 1959 as Recent Advances in Biological Psychiatry. It obtained its current name in 1969 with volume numbering restarting at 1 and is the official journal of the Society of Biological Psychiatry. The founding editor-in-chief was Joseph Wortis, who edited the journal until 1992. The current editor is John H. Krystal (Yale University School of Medicine). In 2016, a spin-off journal was established: Biological Psychiatry: Cognitive Neuroscience and Neuroimaging. In 2021, a second spin-off journal was established: Biological Psychiatry: Global Open Science.

Abstracting and indexing 
The journal is abstracted and indexed in:

According to the Journal Citation Reports, the journal has a 2019 impact factor of 12.095.

Editors-in-chief 
The following persons have been editor-in-chief of the journal:
 Joseph Wortis, 1959–1992
 Wagner H. Bridger, 1992–1997
 Richard C. Josiassen, 1997
 Dennis S. Charney, 1998–2006
 John H. Krystal, 2006–present

See also 

 List of psychiatry journals

References

External links 
 
 Society of Biological Psychiatry website

Psychiatry journals
Neuroscience journals
Publications established in 1959
Elsevier academic journals
Biweekly journals
English-language journals
Academic journals associated with learned and professional societies
Biological psychiatry